is a railway station on the Tadami Line in the town of Aizubange, Fukushima Prefecture, Japan, operated by East Japan Railway Company (JR East).

Lines

Station layout
Tōdera Station has one side platform serving a single bi-directional track. The station is unattended.

History
The station was absorbed into the JR East network upon the privatization of the JNR on April 1, 1987. A new station building was completed in March 2002.

Surrounding area
Kitanomiya Post Office

See also
 List of railway stations in Japan

References

External links

 JR East Station information 

Railway stations in Fukushima Prefecture
Tadami Line
Railway stations in Japan opened in 1928
Stations of East Japan Railway Company
Aizubange, Fukushima